Maurice William "Moe" Mantha (December 13, 1933 – September 18, 2015) was a Canadian ice hockey player and a politician.

Born in North Bay, Ontario, Mantha played minor league hockey for several teams in the American Hockey League, the Quebec Hockey League and the Western Hockey League (minor pro) from 1954 to 1970.  He subsequently returned to Sturgeon Falls and operated his own business (Laurentide Golf Club) for a number of years before entering politics, serving as the Reeve of Springer Township.

In the 1984 federal election, Mantha ran as the Progressive Conservative candidate in Nipissing. He won the seat, defeating Liberal incumbent Jean-Jacques Blais. In the 1988 election, however, Mantha was defeated by Liberal candidate Bob Wood. Mantha ran again in the 1993 election, but lost to Wood again.

Mantha's son, Moe Mantha Jr., played in the National Hockey League from 1980 to 1992, and subsequently became a coach for several teams in the AHL. His grandson, Ryan Mantha, was drafted by the New York Rangers in the fourth round of the 2014 NHL Entry Draft, and was assigned to the Bakersfield Condors of the AHL.

Mantha died on September 18, 2015 at the age of 81 after a brief illness.

References

External links
 
 

1933 births
2015 deaths
Canadian ice hockey defencemen
Canadian sportsperson-politicians
Cleveland Barons (1937–1973) players
Ice hockey people from Ontario
Members of the House of Commons of Canada from Ontario
Progressive Conservative Party of Canada MPs
Providence Reds players
Quebec Aces (AHL) players
Seattle Totems (WHL) players
Sportspeople from North Bay, Ontario